Martín Barrios Do Santos (born 24 January 1999) is a Uruguayan footballer who plays as a midfielder for Uruguayan Segunda División club Racing Montevideo.

References

1999 births
Living people
Uruguayan footballers
Uruguay under-20 international footballers
Uruguayan Primera División players
Racing Club de Montevideo players
Association football midfielders